Kyle Hallock (born August 6, 1988) is an American baseball coach and former pitcher, who is the current head baseball coach of the Bowling Green Falcons. He played college baseball at Kent State for coach Scott Stricklin from 2008 to 2011 before playing professionally from 2011 to 2013.

Playing career
Hallock attended Perkins High School in Sandusky, Ohio, where we played baseball and basketball. He was recruited to play baseball at Kent State, where he would pitch on scholarship. Hallock was drafted in the 49th round of the 2010 Major League Baseball draft by the Philadelphia Phillies, but he declined signing and returned to Kent State. As a senior in 2011, Hallock pitched himself to the Mid-American Conference Baseball Pitcher of the Year Award. Hallock was then drafted in the 10th round of the 2011 Major League Baseball draft by the Houston Astros.

Coaching career
In the fall of 2014, Hallock was named the pitching coach at Malone University. In the fall of 2018, Hallock was named the pitching coach at Bowling Green State University. On June 3, 2020, Danny Schmitz stepped down as the head baseball coach at Bowling Green, and Hallock was promoted to interim head coach.

Head coaching record

See also

References

Living people
1988 births
Sportspeople from Sandusky, Ohio
Baseball pitchers
Kent State Golden Flashes baseball players
Tri-City ValleyCats players
Lexington Legends players
Gulf Coast Astros players
Quad Cities River Bandits players
Oklahoma City RedHawks players
Lancaster JetHawks players
Corpus Christi Hooks players
Malone Pioneers baseball coaches
Bowling Green Falcons baseball coaches
Baseball coaches from Ohio
Baseball players from Ohio